Mark Williams (born 21 August 1954) is a New Zealand singer with Recording Industry Association of New Zealand (RIANZ) number one hit singles, "Yesterday Was Just the Beginning of My Life" (1975) and a cover of Buddy Holly's "It Doesn't Matter Anymore" (1977) before he relocated to Australia later that year. His single, "Show No Mercy" (1990) was a top ten hit in both countries. He has undertaken extensive touring in support of numerous Australian bands and worked in television. In 2006 he became the vocalist for the reformed New Zealand band, Dragon.

Biography

1954–1973: Early years
Williams was born in Dargaville, in the Northland region of New Zealand. At the age of 16 he formed a band called 'Face' with classmates. In September 1970, The Face went on to win the Northland heat of the National Battle of the Bands competition, and finishing third overall in the national grand final held in Auckland. In 1971, Face headed to Auckland where they got a gig at the Otahuhu Community Centre paying $20 a week.

Lew Pryme of Impact Records was one of the judges in the competition and became their manager. The band were signed to Zodiac Records and released the single "Hangin' Around"/"Mr Postman". A national tour followed. In 1973, Lew convinced Williams to leave Face and join a new television show called 'Free Ride'. 

When the television show "Happen Inn" finished in 1973, a new show emerged. It was called "Free Ride" and was hosted by Ray Columbus. Lew convinced Williams to leave the Face and pursue a solo career at the time the new show was being launched. Williams was well suited for the television role, which allowed him to perform in front of a national audience, gaining exposure. Late in 1974, Williams was signed to EMI Music by Alan Galbraith.

1974–1977: New Zealand fame

Late in 1974, Williams released his debut solo single, "Celebration"/"Let Love Come Between Us", but failed to chart. In May 1975, Williams released a song written by Vanda & Young titled "Yesterday Was Just the Beginning of My Life". The song peaked at number 1 on the New Zealand Charts for 3 weeks. The fame stunned the young singer and Williams said “I didn't feel like I was ready for anything. There was constant touring, television, and recording, it was full on.“  Williams' debut self-titled album was released in June and peaked at number 2. The album was certified gold. 

In November 1975, Williams released "Sweet Wine" which peaked at number 7 on the charts. Early in 1976, Lew Pryme took Williams on a promotional visit to Australia. Upon their return to New Zealand, Pryme and Williams parted company. Williams' second album "Sweet Trials" was released in March 1976 and peaked at number 14. "If It Rains" was released and peaked at number 25. 

Late in 1976 the single "Taking It All in Stride" was released and peaked at number 14. Williams' third album, "Taking It All In Stride" was released in June 1977 and was certified gold. It contained the single "It Doesn't Matter Anymore" which peaked at number one, giving Williams his second chart topper. "A House for Sale" was released as the third and final single late in 1977, peaking at number 13.

1978–1989: Australia and Life After Dark

By the end of 1977, Williams left New Zealand for Australia. Williams had found being a 'star' in New Zealand was not all fun. He said “The reaction was either absolute adoration or total disgust. Complete opposites. I was very scared of what it created. That’s one of the reasons I left New Zealand, because it was just too scary.”   

Record producer Alan Galbraith became the new manager of Williams who signed with CBS Records in Australia. He released the album Life After Dark in 1979, which failed to chart. 

During the 1980s, Williams established himself as a session singer in Sydney singing many radio and TV commercials and become a favoured back up vocalist on albums by major Australian talent including; Eurogliders' Absolutely, The Church's Heyday, Renée Geyer's Live at the Basement and Jenny Morris's Body and Soul. In 1985, Williams formed a band called 'Boy Rocking' with Harry Brus and Mark Punch. The group were signed to CBS and released two singles without success.
In 1987, Williams recorded the "Home and Away" theme song with Karen Boddington, which was released as a single in 1988. In 1988, Williams toured with Ian Moss on the hugely successful 'Matchbook' tour.

1990–2005: Australian fame and Mark Williams ZNZ

In 1989, Williams attempted to re-launch his music career and signed to Albert Productions. 

He began working on new material with Harry Vanda and George Young of The Easybeats. In May 1990, Williams released "Show No Mercy" which peaked within the top ten in Australia and New Zealand. "Show No Mercy" was certified ARIA platinum certification in Australia, and was chosen to launch the 1990 New South Wales Rugby League grand final. The second single "Fix of Love" peaked at number 28 in Australia and Williams released his fifth studio album, Mark Williams ZNZ in August 1990.

Williams recorded and released his sixth studio album, Mind over Matter in 1992, with none of the three singles released making the top 50.
In 1993, Williams recorded a cover of "Time After Time" with Tara Morice for the Strictly Ballroom soundtrack. 

In 1999, EMI Music released another greatest hits compilation titled, The Very Best Of. Between 1999 and 2000, Williams worked as a vocal coach on the Australian Popstars series on the Seven Network, including the female pop group Bardot.

2006–present: Dragon and ROCKONZ Hall of Fame

In 2006, Williams was asked by Todd Hunter of the New Zealand rock band Dragon to join. 
In a 2013 interview, Williams recalls “Todd [Hunter] gave me a call out of the blue, flew me over, sat me at the kitchen table and said ‘Hey, wanna join a rock and roll band?’”. Williams said he agreed instantly. Since 2006, The band has toured Australia and New Zealand and has released four studio albums and two extended plays.

In 2010, Williams was inducted into the ROCKONZ Hall of Fame.

Discography

Studio albums

Soundtracks

Live albums

Compilations

Singles

Awards

New Zealand Music Awards
The New Zealand Music Awards are an annual awards night celebrating excellence in New Zealand music and have been presented annually since 1965.

! 
|-
| rowspan="3" | 1975 || Mark Williams || Artist of the Year ||  || rowspan="8" |  
|-
| Mark Williams || Male artist of the Year ||  
|-
| Alan Galbraith for "Yesterday Was Just the Beginning of My Life" by Mark Williams || Producer of the Year ||  
|-
| rowspan="5" | 1976 || Mark Williams || Male artist of the Year ||  
|-
| Sweet Trials || Album of the Year ||  
|-
| David Frazer for "Taking It All in Stride" by Mark Williams || Arranger of the Year ||  
|-
| Peter Hitchcock for "Taking It All in Stride" by Mark Williams || Engineer of the Year ||  
|-
| Alan Galbraith  for "Taking It All in Stride" by Mark Williams || Producer of the Year ||  
|-

ROCKONZ Hall of Fame

! 
|-
| 2010 || Mark Williams || ROCKONZ Hall of Fame||  || 
|-

Variety Artists Club of New Zealand
The Variety Artists Club of New Zealand (VAC) is a non-for-profit organisation and show business club. It was founded in 1966 and became an incorporated society in 1972. Each year the VAC presents prestigious awards to those involved with the entertainment industry.

! 
|-
| 1975 || Mark Williams || Golden Microphone for Performer of the Year||  || 
|-

External links
AudioCulture profile

References

Dragon (band)
Living people
1954 births
20th-century New Zealand male singers
People from Dargaville
CBS Records artists